ULN can refer to :

 Buyant-Ukhaa International Airport, Ulaanbaatar, Mongolia
 Unbreakable Linux Network, a service of Oracle Corporation
 Upper limit of normal, the high limit of a reference range
 A series of a Darlington transistor arrays, e.g. ULN2003A